The Spitzer resistivity (or plasma resistivity) is an expression describing the electrical resistance in a plasma, which was first formulated by Lyman Spitzer in 1950.

The inverse of the Spitzer resistivity  is known as the Spitzer conductivity .

Formulation 
The Spitzer resistivity is classical model of electrical resistivity based upon electron-ion collisions and it is commonly used in plasma physics. The Spitzer resistivity is given by:

In CGS units, the expression is given by:

This formulation assumes a Maxwellian distribution, and the prediction is more accurately determined by 

where the factor  and the classical approximation (i.e. not including neoclassical effects) of the   dependence is:
.

In the presence of a strong magnetic field (the collision rate is small compared to the gyrofrequency), there are two resistivities corresponding to the current perpendicular and parallel to the magnetic field.

The parallel current is equivalent to the unmagnetized case,
.

Disagreements with observation 

Measurements in laboratory experiments and computer simulations have shown that under certain conditions, the resistivity of a plasma tends to be much higher than the Spitzer resistivity. This effect is sometimes known as anomalous resistivity or neoclassical resistivity. It has been observed in space and effects of anomalous resistivity have been postulated to be associated with particle acceleration during magnetic reconnection. There are various theories and models that attempt to describe anomalous resistivity and they are frequently compared to the Spitzer resistivity.

References

Electrical resistance and conductance
Plasma physics